Tapan Kumar Pradhan (born 1972) is an Indian poet, writer and translator from Odisha. He is best known for his poem collection "Kalahandi" which was awarded second place in Sahitya Akademi's Golden Jubilee Indian Literature Translation Prize for Poetry in 2007. His other works include "Equation", "I, She and the Sea", "Wind in the Afternoon" and "Dance of Shiva".

Early life and education
Pradhan was born on 22 October 1972 at Shahid Nagar in Bhubaneswar, Odisha, and spent his childhood in Kalahandi, Nuapada, Keonjhar and Laxmisagar. He studied at Laxmisagar Highschool, BJB College and Utkal University. He also studied briefly at University of Hyderabad, TISS and IIT Kanpur where he discontinued. His father Arakshit Pradhan was an engineer under Government of Odisha but left job in protest against rampant corruption in Government projects. After Arakshit Pradhan left for Himalayas, the family was brought up by his wife Kumudini Pradhan.

Award-winning works
In 2007, Pradhan received the Indian Express Citizen for Peace prize from Shyam Benegal for his essays on communal harmony. He has also won First Prize in All-India Inter-bank Hindi Essay Competition for 2007–08, a prize he also won in 2006–07 for his essays on micro-finance and financial inclusion. He also won First Prize in the RBIA Silver Jubilee essay competition on Future of Central Banking conducted by Reserve Bank of India in 2007–08. He was the First Prize winner in RBI Brand Building Competition, 2007 for his bold satirical essay "Dreaming the RBI Brand", which created shock waves in the Reserve Bank fraternity. During his student days he had won many literary prizes including Upasika Kamaladevi Award for essays on Buddhism, Shatadru prize for short story and Ankur prize for poetry etc. He was Utkal University literary champion during 1993–94. Pradhan's poem "The Buddha Smiled" won commendation first prize in All India Poetry Competition 2013 conducted by Poetry Society (India).

Other literary works
Pradhan's works encompass both secular and spiritual literature. His poems, essays, sketches and short stories have been published in the journals Indian Literature, Journal of Poetry Society, The Statesman, Times of India and The Samaja. His book “Kalahandi” has been included in literature syllabus of several colleges and universities.   He has also co-authored, edited and commented on the spiritual works of German Christian poet Antony Theodore and mystic Kashmiri poet Lalitha Iyer showing the underlying unity of all world religions.

Human rights and crusade against corruption
In 2009, Pradhan petitioned Central Information Commission of India to increase transparency in the Performance Appraisal System in RBI. Pradhan was first person in RBI and public sector employee to obtain his PAR report through RTI Act. As against CIC's view that PAR was "confidential personal information", Pradhan contended that PAR is the appraisal committee's impersonal evaluation of the public service rendered by public servants in their impersonal capacity in a public organisation; and hence there was nothing "personal" about PAR. Following his petition, RBI began disclosing PAR reports to all employees before moving over to a more objective method of appraisal called Performance Management System. In the words of Smt Usha Thorat, the ex-Deputy Governor of RBI, Pradhan makes "ingenious use of the RTI Act" to redress individual grievances.

Professional career
Under UGC Fellowship, Pradhan was awarded the degree of Doctor of Philosophy in 2001 for his dissertation on Structural and Economic Dimensions of Communal Conflict. He has researched the Kandh-Pana conflict in Kandhamal district, Hindu-Muslim relations in Bhadrak and Harijan-Savarna caste dynamics at Brahmabarada in Jajpur district of Odisha. He taught Sociology at Fakir Mohan University, Balasore, before joining Reserve Bank of India in 1999 as a Grade-B officer. In 2014, Pradhan left RBI to join Government of Odisha as Director and Additional Secretary in Finance Department. He established transparent score-based ranking of banks on Financial Inclusion parameters for awarding of Government business.

Personal life
In 2001 Pradhan married Suvashree, a trained Odishi dancer. The couple have a son and a daughter.

Hemangi Sharma fraud case
Hemangi Sharma, a woman officer of NIRDPR Hyderabad lodged complaint with Cyberabad Police that Pradhan had harassed her while delivering a guest lecture at her institute. Pradhan lodged counter complaint against Hemangi for cybercrime, stalking, impersonation and online frauds. Investigation showed that Hemangi Sharma had lodged false case.

Bibliography
Kalahandi - The Untold Story (2020)
I, She and the Sea (2019)
Wind in the Afternoon (2017)
Kandhamal Riots - Origin & the Aftermath (2015)
Structural & Economic Dimensions of Communal Conflict in India (2002)

Edited works
Psalms of Love (2021)
I Am Your Baby, Mother (2020)
Songs of Lust and Love (2020)
Jesus Christ in Love (2019)
Songs of Sadness (2019)

Translations
Kalahandi (2007)

Journal articles

Books on the author

See also
Sahitya Akademi Golden Jubilee Awards
Sahitya Akademi Award to Odisha Writers
Antony Theodore
Rana Nayar

Notes

External links

Pradhan's Landmark RTI Queries

Indian poets
Poets from Odisha
Odia-language writers
English-language poets from India
Indian male poets
21st-century Indian poets
21st-century Indian writers
Living people
Indian academics
Utkal University alumni
1972 births
Recipients of the Sahitya Akademi Golden Jubilee Award
All India Poetry Prize
Indian translators